Vrbice is a municipality and village in Rychnov nad Kněžnou District in the Hradec Králové Region of the Czech Republic. It has about 200 inhabitants.

Administrative parts
The village of Chlínky is an administrative part of Vrbice.

References

Villages in Rychnov nad Kněžnou District